De Jongh is a Dutch surname meaning "junior". It is a variation of the more common form "de Jong" or "de Jonge". Among people with the surname "de Jongh", "de Iongh" or "de Jonghe" are:

Adri de Jongh (born 1970), South African sprinter
Aimée de Jongh (born 1988), Dutch cartoonist
Andrée de Jongh (1916–2007), Belgian World War II resistance fighter
Claude de Jongh (1605–1663), Dutch landscape painter
Dick de Jongh (born 1939), Dutch logician
Eddy de Jongh (born 1931), Dutch art historian
Emily de Jongh-Elhage (born 1946), Netherlands Antilles politician
Gabriel de Jongh (1913–2004), Dutch-born South African painter
Grietje de Jongh (1924–2002), Dutch sprinter
Hendrik Pieter de Jongh (born 1970), Dutch football manager
Igone de Jongh (born 1979), Dutch ballet dancer 
John de Jongh Jr. (born 1957), American territorial administrator
Juan de Jongh (born 1988), South African rugby player
Jules de Jongh, American voice actress
Lilly de Jongh Osborne (1883–1975), Costa Rican writer and art collector
Ludolf Leendertsz de Jongh (1616–1679), Dutch genre and portrait painter
Mandy de Jongh (born 1961), Dutch taekwondo practitioner
Michelle De Jongh (born 1997), Swedish footballer
Nicholas de Jongh (born 1944), British theater critic and playwright
Steven de Jongh (born 1973), Dutch bicycle racer
Saskia de Jongh (born 1975), Dutch born executive at UberEats
Theunis Willem de Jongh (1913–1999/2000), South African bank governor
Tinus de Jongh (1885–1942), Dutch-born South African painter

De Iongh
Carel de Iongh (1883–1964), Dutch soldier and sports shooter, brother of Hendrik
Hendrik de Iongh (1877–1962), Dutch soldier and fencer, brother of Carel

De Jonghe / Dejonghe
Adriaen de Jonghe (1511–1575), Dutch Renaissance humanist
Albert Dejonghe (1894–1981), Belgian racing cyclist
Gustave Léonard de Jonghe (1829–1893), Belgian portrait and genre painter
Jan Baptiste de Jonghe (1785–1844), Belgian landscape painter
Jimmy De Jonghe (born 1992), Belgian footballer
Kevin De Jonghe (born 1991), Belgian racing cyclist

See also
De Jong
De Jonge
Jong (disambiguation)

Dutch-language surnames
Afrikaans-language surnames